The Church of St James the Less, is a grade I listed church in Hadleigh, Essex.

The church is of predominantly Norman construction with the chancel and nave dating to the 12th century.

References

Grade I listed churches in Essex
Hadleigh, Essex